The Polish Army Medal was established by Poland on 3 September 1999 to recognize service to the Polish Army by foreign civilians and military personnel. The medal is presented in three grades Gold, Silver, and Bronze by the Polish Minister of National Defence.  Most awards are presented to members of allied armed forces, but the medal is also awarded to civilians who contribute to promoting the history and traditions of the Polish Army outside of Poland.

Appearance
The medal is either gold, silver, or bronze, depending on the grade, 36 mm in diameter. On the obverse is a red enameled cross pattée with concave arm bases.  Between the arms of the cross are stylized rays. Under the arms of the cross is a laurel wreath.  Superimposed on the cross is a silver crowned eagle for all grades. The reverse is plain aside for a two line inscription "WOJSKO POLSKIE" (Polish Army). The medal is suspended from a ribbon 38 mm wide.  The colors are light brown with blue edges, separated by yellow pinstripes.  In the center is a half white and half red stripe.  On the ribbon bar a gold vertical bar is worn in the center for the gold medal and a silver vertical bar is worn in the center for the silver medal.  The ribbon bar of the bronze medal is unadorned.

Notable recipients

 General John R. Allen
 General George W. Casey, Jr.
 General Carter Ham
 General James Mattis
 General David Petraeus
 Lieutenant General Mark Hertling
 Major General William L. Enyart

References 

Military awards and decorations of Poland